Scott Foster Siman (born July 22, 1954) is a leading American country music entertainment executive based in Nashville, Tennessee.   He oversaw the rise of country music superstar Tim McGraw and the launch of Dancing With the Stars celebrity Julianne Hough, among others.

Career
Attorney

Siman was previously an entertainment attorney with Benson & Siman, whose clients included Alan Jackson (Country Music Hall of Fame Member), Brooks & Dunn (Country Music Hall of Fame Member), Charlie Daniels, Deanna Carter, John Berry, Chris LeDoux, James Stroud, Paul Worley and Chips Moman. He worked with such diverse artists as Judson Spence, Ben Folds, Will Owsley, Millard Powers and Jody Spence; as well as numerous executives and music publishers.

Senior Vice President Sony

Siman later served as senior vice president of Sony Music-Nashville, where he signed the Dixie Chicks to their initial deal as well as writers Marcus Hummon One of These Days (Marcus Hummon song) and David Vincent Williams ("I'm Movin' On").  He would later serve as attorney for the Dixie Chicks.  While at Sony, he was appointed to the Academy of Country Music board of directors and would go on to serve as president and chairman of the board. Additionally, he served on the Country Music Association board where he spearheaded the board decision to establish CMA Music Fest after the board had voted to end Fan Fair.

RPM Management

He managed country music star Tim McGraw where his guidance lead McGraw to be named Artist of the Decade securing more airplay than any artist in any format and the most played song of the Decade, all formats with Something Like That. Other management highlights include #1 singles with Jessica Andrews (Who I Am) and Carolyn Dawn Johnson Single White Female, and he guided two-time Dancing with the Stars champion and actress Julianne Hough to a #1 country album and two ACM Awards in 2009.  He worked with the youngest artist to ever reach #1 on Billboard Top Country Album charts, Billy Gilman.

While Siman was president and chairman of the board of the Academy of Country Music Awards (1996–2000) where he was instrumental in the repositioning of the association within the country music industry.  He is former board member of the Country Music Foundation, and a participant in Leadership Music and Leadership Nashville.  Siman served on the Nashville Cystic Fibrosis Foundation board and was a recipient of the Heart of Country award from the national organization.

RPM Music Group

As a co-owner of RPM Music Group, he has helped develop a publishing catalog that owns the rights to such hit songs as the Grammy winning "It's Five O'Clock Somewhere" (Alan Jackson), "The Power" (Cher and Amy Grant; ACM Song of the Year "I'm Movin' On" (Rascal Flatts), "Leave the Pieces" (The Wreckers), "What Kinda Gone" (Chris Cagle), "Anything Goes" (Randy Houser), Montgomery Gentry singles "One in Every Crowd" "Long Line of Losers" and "Oughta Be a Song About That", "Let There Be Cowgirls" (Chris Cagle), "I Ain't Your Mama" (Maggie Rose), Better (Maggie Rose Song)" (Maggie Rose), "Wake Up Loving You" (Craig Morgan), "Say You Do" (Dierks Bentley) and has songs featured on four number 1 country albums in 2014 from the Band Perry ("Chainsaw") Luke Bryan ("Goodbye Girl", Dierks Bentley ("Say You Do") and Scotty McCreery ("Blue Jean Baby"). Other significant cuts include "Ex to See" and the #1 single "Make You Miss Me" on the multiplatinum Sam Hunt debut album; "Save it for a Rainy Day," Kenny Chesney (a 3-week #1 single); and "Break Up With Him," Old Dominion (band) (a 2-week #1 single).

RPM Entertainment

RPME's first release was vocal phenom Maggie Rose. Her first single, I Ain't Your Mama was #1 Most Added on the Mediabase country singles chart the first week of its release. RPME also represented, among others, Dack Janiels/Chase Rice at country radio.  The first single Ready Set Roll and was a top 5 single at Country radio.  Siman left RPM Entertainment in 2014 to head up EMCo.

EMCo

Since 2014, Siman serves as President of EM.Co which oversees the operations for Tim McGraw.  Major successes include a performance by McGraw on the 2015 Oscars; a Clio Award for an integrated campaign for "Humble and Kind" helping propel the song to such honors as a Grammy for Best Country Song, CMA Song of the Year, NSAI Song of the Year and Favorite Country Song AMA's.  Billboard Magazine named Siman one of their 2018 Power Players for his work with McGraw and helping oversee the launch of his Soul2Soul World Tour with Faith Hill, garnering them the Legends of Live award and Billboard's No. 1 country music tour for 2017.  He was named to the Billboard list again in 2019.  McGraw headlined the VIP Tailgate Pregame at Super Bowl 53 in 2019, and released two books which reached #2 on the New York Times Bestseller lists.  McGraw headlined the College Football Championship game in his home state of Louisiana in 2020.  EMCo helped oversee the launch of McGraw's fitness brand, TRUMAV, with the establishment of the first fitness center in Nashville, Tennessee. Nielson Broadcast Data System named Tim McGraw the artist with the biggest radio audience for all genres, all artists, for the 2010s.

Personal life
Siman is the son of country music pioneer Si Siman, who was also in the talent and music publishing business and was an executive with Crossroads TV Productions, which created the first popular country music program on network television, Ozark Jubilee. His middle name is in honor of Ralph Foster, Crossroads TV's president and his father's mentor when he was born in Springfield, Missouri.  Si Siman is credited with securing record deals for Chet Atkins, Porter Wagoner and Brenda Lee, among others.  He also is responsible for securing multiple recordings of "Satisfied Mind," all of which were in the top 10 at country radio at the same time.

He is a graduate of Vanderbilt University. and the University of Missouri School of Law. While at Vanderbilt he joined the Gamma chapter of Delta Kappa Epsilon fraternity, where he was chapter president. He is a former Old Natchez CC club champion and qualified for the Tennessee State Mid Am and the Tennessee Four Ball and Senior Four Ball Championships multiple times.

Siman is married to Teresa Siman and has three daughters, Rosie Siman Yakob, Lillian Keil and Marion Siman.

In 2014, Siman was elected to the Springfield, Missouri Public Schools Hall of Fame.

References

1954 births
Living people
People from Springfield, Missouri
University of Missouri alumni
Talent managers
American music industry executives